Chamani-ye Vasat (also Romanized as Chamanī-ye Vasaţ and Chamānī-ye Vasaţ) is a village in Kuhsarat Rural District, in the Central District of Minudasht County, Golestan Province, Iran. At the 2006 census, its population was 97, in 24 families.

References 

Populated places in Minudasht County